Martine-Elisabeth Mercier Descloux (16 December 1956 – 20 April 2004) was a French musician, singer-songwriter, composer, actress, writer and painter.

Early life
Mercier Descloux grew up in Lyon, France, but returned to her native Paris in her teens to attend art school. With her partner Michel Esteban, she helped establish the store Harry Cover, temple of the punk movement in France, and the new wave magazine Rock News. She struck up friendships with Patti Smith and Richard Hell when visiting New York in 1975, and both contributed material to her first book, Desiderata. She and Esteban moved to New York in 1977, meeting Michael Zilkha, with whom Esteban formed ZE Records.

Musical career
With guitarist D.J. Barnes (Didier Esteban), Mercier Descloux formed the performance art duo Rosa Yemen, and recorded an eponymous mini-album for ZE Records in 1978. The following year, ZE released her solo debut LP Press Color. Self-taught as a guitarist, she expressed herself as a minimalist within the no wave genre, concentrating on single-note lines combined with wrong-note harmonies and funky rhythms. While the record did not sell well, she did tour the USA and Europe.

Island Records boss Chris Blackwell bankrolled the sessions in Nassau, Bahamas for her second album Mambo Nassau, with Compass Point All Stars engineer Steven Stanley and keyboardist Wally Badarou co-writing and producing. The album was influenced by African music as well as art rock, funk and soul. While the record was unsuccessful in the U.S., it won her a contract with CBS Records in France.

Returning to France, she released two singles, then traveled through Africa, drawing on the music of Soweto for the infectious "Mais où Sont Passées les Gazelles?" ("But where have the gazelles gone?"), a hit in France in 1984, and the album Zulu Rock, with producer Adam Kidron. Collaborating with Kidron as a producer, she recorded the albums One for the Soul (1986) in Brazil with the jazz trumpeter Chet Baker and later Suspense (1988) in London with the American musician Mark Cunningham of Mars. She also acted, composed film scores, and wrote poetry.

In the mid 1990s, she moved to Corsica and devoted herself to painting and writing an unpublished novel.

Death
In 2003, she was diagnosed with ovarian and colon cancers, from which she died the following year. Fellow new wave musician and ZE labelmate Cristina dedicated a song on the 2004 re-release of her album Sleep It Off to Mercier Descloux, "chère copine in adversity...In loving memory of her talent, her courage, and her kindness."

After her death, Esteban worked with the record label Light in the Attic to reissue some of her recordings.

Albums 

 Rosa Yemen – Live in N.Y.C July 1978 (1978)
 Press Color (1979)
 Mambo Nassau (1981)
 Zulu Rock (1984)
 One for the Soul (1985)
 Suspense (1988)

References

External links
 
 

1956 births
2004 deaths
CBS Records artists
Deaths from cancer in France
Deaths from colorectal cancer
Deaths from ovarian cancer
French women guitarists
French film score composers
French rock guitarists
French rock singers
French singer-songwriters
Island Records artists
Musicians from Paris
No wave musicians
Musicians from Lyon
Philips Records artists
Polydor Records artists
Post-punk musicians
Singers from Paris
ZE Records artists
20th-century guitarists
20th-century French women singers
Women punk rock singers
20th-century women guitarists